Johann Heß (or Hess) (23 September 1490 – 5 January 1547) was a German Lutheran theologian and Protestant Reformer of Breslau (Wroclaw).

Heß was born in Nuremberg. He attended the universities of Leipzig and Wittenberg, where he was taught in jurisprudence and liberal arts. In Wittenberg he became a follower of Martin Luther, and stayed in touch with the Protestant Reformation when he relocated to Neisse (Nysa) in 1513 as the secretary of Johannes V. Thurzo, bishop of Breslau. In 1518 Heß moved to Bologna to study theology, completing his studies there in 1519. On the way back to Silesia he stopped in Wittenberg and became a friend of Philipp Melanchthon. In 1520 he was ordained to the priesthood and in 1523 Heß was pressed by the city council of Breslau (probably at the instigation of Laurentius Corvinus) to become pastor of St. Maria Magdalena church. In the coming years he slowly introduced Protestant teachings in Breslau, presenting his ideas in a disputation at St Dorothy's monastery at Breslau in 1524. His careful approach even normalized the relationship to Catholic bishop Jakob von Salza. Theologically he, Ambrosius Moibanus, pastor of St. Elisabeth church, and the city council of Breslau sided with Wittenberg and opposed Caspar Schwenckfeld and his followers in Liegnitz (Legnica). In 1541 he took part in the Conference of Regensburg. In 1547 Heß died in Breslau.

References 

Julius Köstlin, ‘Johann Heß, der Breslauer Reformator’, Zeitschrift des Vereins für Geschichte und Alterthum Schlesiens 6 (1864), pp. 97–131, 181-265.
Adolf Henschel, Dr. Johannes Heß der Breslauer Reformator. Schriften für das deutsche Volk 37 (Halle: Verein für Reformationsgeschichte, 1901).
Neue Deutsche Biographie (NDB), Bayerische Akademie der Wissenschaften, München, Bd. 9, pp. 7–8.
Grantley McDonald, ‘Laurentius Corvinus and the Epicurean Luther’, Lutheran Quarterly 22 (2008), pp. 161–76.

1490 births
1547 deaths
16th-century German Lutheran clergy
Clergy from Nuremberg
German Protestant Reformers
Leipzig University alumni
University of Wittenberg alumni
University of Bologna alumni